BCV could refer to:

Places
 Bruce Grove railway station, London, England

Airports
 Birchwood Airport (FAA LID code), an airport near Birchwood, Alaska
 Hector Silva Airstrip (IATA code), Belmopan, Belize

Banks
 Central Bank of Venezuela
 BCV Building, headquarters of the bank, Caracas, Venezuela
 Banque cantonale vaudoise, which is a bank in Switzerland

Science and medicine
 Beclabuvir, an antiviral drug for the treatment of hepatitis C virus
 Bovine coronavirus, an RNA virus

Other uses
 BCV: Battle Construction Vehicles, a fighting game for the PlayStation 2
 BCV Volley Cup, former name of the Montreux Volley Masters women's volleyball tournament, Switzerland
 Bristol Commercial Vehicles, a subsidiary of Bristol Tramways
 Bulgnéville Contrex Vittel FC (BCV), a French football club
 Business continuance volume
 GLV/BCV or BCV, the callsign of a TV station in Bendigo and regional Victoria, Australia
 Melbourne School of Theology, formerly known as the Bible College of Victoria

See also

BCVS

 BVC (disambiguation)
 VBC (disambiguation)
 VCB (disambiguation)
 CBV (disambiguation)
 CVB (disambiguation)